The Fongshan Community Culture Museum is a community museum in Fengshan District, Kaohsiung, Taiwan.

History
The museum building was originally the Fengshan District Health Office's Youth Branch. After the health office moved to a new building, the building was left idle. In 2001, Fongshan Mayor Lin San-lang instructed the renovation of the building into a museum. The construction of the museum cost more than NT$4 million, in which NT$3 million was subsidized by the Council of Cultural Affairs and the remaining by Fengshan District Office. The museum was finally inaugurated on 19 February 2006.

Architecture
The museum is a two-story building with a total floor area of 200 m2.

Exhibition
The ground floor of the museum displays the history of Blacksmith Street and Cishan rice cake. The upper floor displays the stone carving and arts as well as classroom. The outdoor area displays the stone carving learning place.

Events
The museum regularly holds various events, such as old photos exhibitions, rice cake and pottery making, leisure activities for residents etc.

Transportation
The museum is accessible within walking distance north of Fongshan West–City Council Station of Kaohsiung MRT.

See also
 List of museums in Taiwan

References

2006 establishments in Taiwan
Community museums
Museums established in 2006
Museums in Kaohsiung